The Filmfare Best Background Score is given by the Filmfare magazine as part of its annual Filmfare Awards for Hindi films.

Although the awards started in 1954, the Best Background Score category was not introduced until 1998.

Superlatives
Most Awards
 A. R. Rahman – 4
 Amit Trivedi – 3
 Pritam – 2
 Sandeep Chowta – 2
 Ranjit Barot  – 2

Awards

Here is a list of the award winners and the films for which they won.

References

See also 
 Filmfare Award 
 Bollywood
 Cinema of India

Background Score